Grim Town is the second studio album by Northern Irish singer-songwriter Soak. It was released on 26 April 2019 under Rough Trade Records.

Critical reception
Grim Town received generally favourable reviews from contemporary music critics. At Metacritic, which assigns a normalised rating out of 100 to reviews from mainstream critics, the album received an average score of 79, based on 12 reviews.

Track listing

Charts

References

2019 albums
SOAK albums
Rough Trade Records albums